A sweatshirt is a long-sleeved pullover shirt fashioned out of thick, usually cotton cloth material. Sweatshirts are almost exclusively casual attire and hence not as dressy as some sweaters. Sweatshirts may or may not have a hood. A sweatshirt with a hood is now usually referred to as a hoodie, although more formal media still use the term "hooded sweatshirt".

History
In 1920, Benjamin Russell Jr., a quarterback for the Alabama Crimson Tide Football team, was tired of the constant chafing and itching caused by their wool football uniforms. He worked with his father, whose company Russell Manufacturing Company made women's and children's knit garments, to come up with a better option. They created a thick cotton practice jersey that was a modification of a ladies’ union suit top. These loose, collarless pullovers were the first sweatshirts. A new division of the company, focusing solely on the production of sweatshirts, became the Russell Athletic Company.

The sweatshirt's potential as a portable advertising tool was discovered in the 1960s when U.S. universities began printing their names on them to exhibit school pride. The sweatshirt, along with the T-shirt, provided a cheap and effective way of disseminating information on a mass scale. The T-shirt slogan fad of the seventies inevitably translated to sweatshirts. Due to the relative simplicity of customization and the power of clever graphics combined with catchphrases, sweatshirts became a vehicle for personal expression for both the designer and the wearer.

In Australia, the sweatshirt is referred to as a 'Sloppy Joe'.

References

History of fashion
History of clothing (Western fashion)
Tops (clothing)
 20th-century fashion
 21st-century fashion
Sportswear